Waimate Creek is a natural watercourse in the southern Canterbury region of New Zealand's South Island.  Its original Māori name was Te Waimatemate, which means "slowly moving waters".

Catchment 

Waimate Creek runs roughly eastwards, rising in the Hunter Hills before reaching the narrow coastal plain of the Pacific Ocean, skirting the west and southern side of Waimate township and then discharging metres from the sea into the Wainono Dead Arm, which links the Waihao River and Wainono Lagoon.

Ecology 

Waimate Creek is considered by Environment Canterbury to be in good ecological condition. This is due to intact native forest at its headwaters and a riparian zone that has remained relatively intact. This zone contains vegetation such as willows and broom. Fish species found within the stream include the Canterbury galaxias, New Zealand longfin eel, and upland bully.

Crossings 

State Highway 82 crosses Waimate Creek on the southwestern side of Waimate. In Studholme, near its discharge into the Wainono Dead Arm, it is crossed by State Highway 1 and the Main South Line railway. It was formerly crossed by the Waimate Gorge Branch railway on the southwestern side of Waimate but this branch line closed in 1953 and the bridge has been removed.

References 

Rivers of Canterbury, New Zealand
Waimate District
Rivers of New Zealand